This is an article about Sibylla of Burgundy, queen of Sicily. For her namesake, see Sibylla of Burgundy, Duchess of Burgundy.

Sibylla of Burgundy (1126 – 16 September 1150 in Salerno) was Queen of Sicily as the second consort of Roger II of Sicily.

She was a daughter of Hugh II, Duke of Burgundy, and his wife Felicia-Matilda of Mayenne.

In 1150, Sibylla married King Roger II of Sicily. On 29 August of that year, Sibylla gave birth to a stillborn child and died of complications of the childbirth. She was buried in the church of the Monastery of La Trinità Cava de' Tirreni.

References

Sources

1126 births
1150 deaths
House of Burgundy
Royal consorts of Sicily
12th-century Italian women
12th-century Sicilian people
Hauteville family
Deaths in childbirth
Roger II of Sicily